WKOA (105.3 FM), known as "K 105", is a radio station licensed to the city of Lafayette, Indiana. The station operates on the FM radio frequency of 105.3 MHz, FM channel 287. The studios are located at 3575 McCarty Lane in Lafayette, Indiana. The tower is located at the same location.

History
WKOA signed on the air as WASK-FM in 1964 featuring a Beautiful music or easy listening format. In the mid-1970s, FM radio was growing in popularity and FM stations across the country which were up to this point more of a novelty band was now being embraced for its clarity and ability to broadcast a stereo sound. WLFQ (103.9) in Crawfordsville signed-on with a country format in June 1974, directing its programming to Lafayette. WASK-FM decided to make the change to country in September 1974. It became known as "Indiana Country FM 105" utilizing Bill Robinson's "Music Works" automated radio programming service.

WASK-FM began using the slogan "K 105" in the summer of 1983 shortly after being acquired by Duchossois Communications. It retained its country music format and gradually transitioned to completely live/local programming over the next two years.

Former air personalities on K 105 include Ellen K., later known for her work with Rick Dees on KIIS Los Angeles, and Dean McNeil who became the program director of US-99 (WUSN) Chicago.

In 1994, as a result of a pending move to place a news/talk simulcast on 1450 WASK and WASK Incorporated's newly acquired WIIZ (98.7), K 105 changed call letters to WKOA. The station first achieved its #1 ranking in the fall of 1989 and has consistently ranked #1 since, according to Lafayette's Arbitron ratings.

In 2006, the station, along with sister station WASK-AM/FM, shut down its long-standing news department. On March 17, 2008 K105 and sister station WASK 98.7 formed a partnership with WLFI TV 18 to provide news content.

Schurz Communications announced on September 14, 2015 that it would exit broadcasting and sell its television and radio stations, including WKOA, to Gray Television for $442.5 million. Though Gray initially intended to keep Schurz' radio stations, on November 2, it announced that Neuhoff Communications would acquire WKOA and Schurz' other Lafayette radio stations for $8 million.

Programming
WKOA features contemporary country music with 80s and 90s flashbacks. The station also features live and local DJs 24 hours a day with the exception of weekend specialty programming. K 105 also features NASCAR Nextel Cup racing.

WKOA's programming is led by Operations Manager Mike Shamus.

Not live and local.  Shawn Parr's Across America (Syndicated) from 7p-Midnight weekdays. No air talent from midnight to 5am.

References

External links
WKOA official website

KOA
Country radio stations in the United States
Radio stations established in 1974
1974 establishments in Indiana